The Radio Hour is a musical by Walton Jones. Using popular songs from the 1940s, it portrays the final holiday broadcast of the Mutual Manhattan Variety Cavalcade on the New York radio station WOV in December 1942.

Plot

A little New York City radio station called WOV records a broadcast for American soldiers serving overseas in World War II. The narrative concerns the harassed producer, the drunken lead singer, the second banana who dreams of singing a ballad, the delivery boy who wants a chance in front of the mic, and the young trumpet player who chooses a fighter plane over Glenn Miller.

Characters

List of Musical Numbers
 "(I've Got a Gal In) Kalamazoo" – Clifton, Chorus ("Chattanooga Choo Choo" in earlier editions)
 "Pepsi Cola" – Neal, B.J., Connie, Ginger (with sounds performed by Lou)
 "Daddy" – Connie, The Band
 "Love Is Here to Stay" – Johnny
 "That Old Black Magic" – Ann
 "Ain't She Sweet" – Biff, All
 "How About You?" – B.J., Connie
 "Blue Moon" – Neal
 "Chiquita Banana" – All Girls
 "Rose of the Rio Grande" – Geneva, Men & The Band
 "I'll Never Smile Again" – Johnny, Quintet (Neal, B.J., Ann, Ginger, Connie)
 "Boogie Woogie Bugle Boy" – B.J., Connie, Ginger
 "Blues in the Night" – Ginger, Men
 "Jingle Bells" – All (except Johnny)
 "I Got It Bad (and That Ain't Good)"  – Geneva
 "You Go to My Head" - B.J. ("At Last" in earlier editions)
 "The Five O'Clock Whistle"  – Connie, The Band ("Little Brown Jug" in earlier editions)
 "Have Yourself a Merry Little Christmas" – Ann
 "Strike Up the Band" – Full Company
 "I'll Be Seeing You" – Full Company
 "Mutual Manhattan Variety Cavalcade" – Full Company

References

 Notes
 "'1940s Radio Hour' comes in loud & clear" by Klint Lowry, https://archive.today/20041114205822/http://www.thenewsherald.com/stories/051204/lif_20040512004.shtml
 "Theater group dials in retro radio musical" by Carol South, Grand Traverse Herald, https://web.archive.org/web/20071018012257/http://gtherald.com/2005/feb/23radio.htm
 https://web.archive.org/web/20070922121606/http://www.cvca.net/archives/shows/1940/1940rh.html
 "'Radio' a swinging trip to '40s" by Kyle Lawson, The Arizona Republic, http://www.azcentral.com/ent/arts/articles/0115radiorev15.html
 Character List and Descriptions. https://web.archive.org/web/20080704164605/http://www.charlestonlightoperaguild.org/1940RadioHour.htm

External links
 

1979 plays
Broadway musicals
Plays set in the 1940s